Anthistarcha binocularis is a moth in the family Gelechiidae. It was described by Edward Meyrick in 1929. It is found in Brazil (Bahia).

The wingspan is 15–16 mm. The forewings are grey with the tips of the scales white, forming a close minute irroration. Scattered black scales sometimes form longitudinal streaks, especially on the dorsal half anteriorly, and one from the end of the cell to beneath the apex. There is a light grey tuft irrorated with black representing the plical stigma and there is an 8-shaped light yellow-ochreous spot edged with raised black scales on the end of the cell. Two or three sometimes indistinct black oblique strigulae are found on the costa at about two-thirds, and an interrupted black costal line runs towards the apex. The hindwings are pale bluish-grey.

Larvae have been recorded feeding in twigs of Anacardium occidentale.

References

Moths described in 1929
Chelariini
Moths of South America